The Filmfare Bangla Best Male Playback Singer Award is given by Indian film magazine Filmfare as a part of its annual Filmfare Awards Bangla for Bengali films, to recognise a male playback singer who has delivered an outstanding performance in a film song.

Superlatives

Arijit Singh was the first holder of this award back in 2014 for the song "Mon Majhi Re" from Boss. Nachiketa Chakraborty won the award on the second edition in 2017.
Arijit Singh also holds the record for most nominations (10), Youngest winner, Youngest nominee. Anupam Roy holds the record for most nominations without ever winning (7).
Nachiketa Chakraborty and Arijit Singh has won the award twice, while Anirban Bhattacharya and Ishan Mitra has won the award once.

Most Wins

Multiple Nominees

List of winners

2010s
 2014 Arijit Singh – "Mon Majhi Re" from Boss
 Arijit Singh – "Ki Kore Toke Bolbo" from Rangbaaz
 Arijit Singh – "Din Khon Mapa Ache" from Hawa Bodol
 Anupam Roy – "Istofa Dilam" from Nayika Sangbad
 Anindya Chatterjee – "Raat Jaaye" from Alik Sukh
 2017 Nachiketa Chakraborty - "Ek Purono Mosjide" from Zulfiqar
 Arijit Singh - "Tomake Chuye Dilam" from Bastu-Shaap
 Anupam Roy - "Aami Ajkal Bhalo Achi" from Zulfiqar
 Anupam Roy - "Mon Bhalo Nei" from Shaheb Bibi Golaam
 Surojit Chatterjee - "Bhromor" from Praktan
 2018 Nachiketa Chakraborty – "Keno Erokom Kichu Holo Na" from Posto
 Anindya Chatterjee - "Jonaki" from Posto
 Anupam Roy & Saheb Chatterjee - "Je Tore Pagol Bole" from Maacher Jhol
 Arijit Singh - "Maula Re" from Chaamp
 Arijit Singh - "Tui Chunli Jakhan" from Samantaral
 Anupam Roy - "Dawttok" from Maacher Jhol

2020s
 2021 Anirban Bhattacharya - "Kicchu Chaini Aami" from Shah Jahan Regency
 Anupam Roy - "Aalote Aalote Dhaka" from Konttho
 Arijit Singh - "Maa" from Gotro
 Neel Dutt - "Chhiley Bondhu" from Finally Bhalobasha
 Rupankar Bagchi - "Tomay Mone Porchilo" from Robibaar
 Timir Biswas - "Amar Bhul Hoye Geche Priyo" from Rajlokhi O Srikanto

 2022 Ishan Mitra - "Mayar Kangal" from Olpo Holeo Sotti
 Anirban Bhattacharya - "Priyotama" from Dracula Sir
 Anindya Chatterjee - "Tomar E Toh Kachhe" from Prem Tame
 Anindya Chatterjee - "Tonic Title Track" from Tonic
 Anupam Roy - "Je Kawta Din" from Dwitiyo Purush
 Mahtim Shakib - "Taakey Olpo Kachhe Dakchhi" from Prem Tame
 Shovan Ganguly - "Raasher Gaan" from Golondaaj

 2023 Arijit Singh - "Aaajkey Raatey" from Bismillah
Debraj Bhattacharya- "Notun Premer Gaan" Ballabhpurer Roopkotha
 Arijit Singh - "Bhalobashar Morshum" from X=Prem
 Arijit Singh - "Oboseshe" from Kishmish
 Dev Arijit - "Tujh Sang Bandhi Dor" from Dharmajuddha
 Ranojay Bhattaharjee - "Aay Khuku Aay" from Aay Khuku Aay
 Sonu Nigam - "Mukti Dao" from Kacher Manush

See also
 Filmfare Awards Bangla
 Bengali Cinema
 Cinema of India

External links
 Official site

Indian music awards